Paraguayan Communist Party (independent) (in Spanish: Partido Comunista Paraguayo (independiente) is a communist political party in Paraguay. PCP(i) was founded in 1967 as a split from the Paraguayan Communist Party (PCP). Since the defeat of the guerrilla groups led by the party in 1963, opposition to Creydt in the PCP had grown. He was first criticised for his authoritarian behaviour and later for his anti-Cuban and pro-Chinese positions. He was deposed as secretary general in August 1965 and excluded from the party in 1967. His party faction first kept the same name as the pro-soviet faction but since 1973 “independent” was added to the party name.
Many of the activities of the PCP(i) were directed against the PCP. The party was subjected to harsh repression by the regime of Alfredo Stroessner. It publishes “Unidad Paraguaya”. When Creydt died in 1987 the party was very weak. When Stroessner fell in 1989 the party stayed in a semi-clandestinity.

International relations
The PCP(i) was a maoist party. Oscar Creydt visited China in 1977 and 1980 and supported the political orientation of the post-Mao regime. The PCP(i) today is a member party of the maoist International Coordination of Revolutionary Parties and Organizations.

The maoist PCP and its successor the PCP(i) are sometimes called Paraguayan Communist Party (Marxist–Leninist) or Communist Party of Paraguay.

Footnotes

References
 Alexander, Robert J., Maoism in the Developing World, Praeger Publishers, Westport, 1999, p.149-151
 Alexander, Robert J., Political Parties of the Americas, Canada, Latin America and the West Indies, Greenwood Press, Westport, 1982, p. 578-579
 Akademie für Gesellschaftswissenschaften beim Zentralkomitee der SED, Institut für Imperialismusforschung, Institut für Internationale Arbeiterbewegung. Dokumentation. Die auf die heutige Pekinger Führung orientierten, die linksradikalen, die guerilleristischen Gruppen und die pseudolinken Terroristen-Gruppierungen in der kapitalistischen Welt. Ende der 70er/Anfang der 80er Jahre, October 1980 (Berlin), p. 213
 Hobday, Charles, Communist and Marxist Parties of the World, Longman Group, Harlow 1986, p. 369
 Lo Bianco, Miguel, Oscar Creydt. Luces y sombras, in: Pensamiento Crítico en el Paraguay. Memoria del Ciclo de Conversatorios 2014, BASE-IS, Asunción, 2014, p. 75-92
 Nickson, Andrew, Oscar Creydt. Una biografía, El Lector, Asunción, 2011
 Rosales, Humberto, Historia del Parido Comunista Paraguayo (1928 - 1990), 2009

External links

Communist parties in Paraguay
Anti-revisionist organizations
Stalinist parties
Maoist parties
Far-left politics in Paraguay
Formerly banned communist parties
Political parties established in 1967
Political parties in Paraguay
International Coordination of Revolutionary Parties and Organizations